El Salvador competed in the 2015 Pan American Games in Toronto, Ontario, Canada from July 10 to 26, 2015.

On July 2, 2015 swimmer Marcelo Acosta was named the flagbearer of the team during the opening ceremony.

Competitors
The following table lists El Salvador's delegation per sport and gender.

Medalists

The following competitors from El Salvador won medals at the games. In the by discipline sections below, medalists' names are bolded.

|style="text-align:left; width:78%; vertical-align:top;"|

Archery

El Salvador qualified one male and one female archer.

Athletics

El Salvador qualified one male and one female athlete.

Road and track events

Badminton

El Salvador qualified a team of two athletes (one man and one woman).

Beach volleyball

El Salvador qualified a men's and women's pair for a total of four athletes.

Bowling

El Salvador qualified a full team of four athletes (two men and two women).

Singles

Doubles

Boxing

El Salvador qualified one female boxer.

Woman

Cycling

El Salvador qualified two female cyclists (one each for road and track events).

Road
Women

Track
Keirin

Sprint

Equestrian

El Salvador qualified two athletes in the eventing competition.

Eventing

Fencing

El Salvador qualified 3 fencers (3 women).

Gymnastics

El Salvador qualified one male gymnast. Pablo Velasquez originally was the first reserve after qualification but later competed in the final.

Artistic
Men
Individual Qualification

Qualification Legend: Q = Qualified to apparatus final

Judo

El Salvador qualified a team of four judokas (three men and one woman). However, they did not register the female athlete for the competition.

Men

Karate

El Salvador qualified 1 athlete. Jorge Merino had the country's highest placement, a silver medal finish.

Roller sports

El Salvador qualified one male and one female roller skater.

Speed

Rowing

El Salvador qualified 3 boats and four athletes (one male and three female).

Qualification Legend: FA=Final A (medal); FB=Final B (non-medal); R=Repechage

Sailing

El Salvador qualified one sailor.

Shooting

El Salvador qualified 9 shooters (six male and three female).

Men

Women

Swimming

El Salvador qualified four swimmers (two men and two women).

Men

Taekwondo

El Salvador received a wildcard to enter one female athlete.

Tennis

El Salvador qualified one athlete in the men's singles event.

Men

Weightlifting

El Salvador qualified one male and one female weightlifter.

Wrestling

El Salvador received one wildcard.

Men's freestyle

See also
El Salvador at the 2016 Summer Olympics

References

Nations at the 2015 Pan American Games
P
2015